Lalocalalla Dam, is an earthfill dam on a local river near Samudrapur in the state of Maharashtra in India.

Specifications

Purpose
 Irrigation

See also
 Dams in Maharashtra
 List of reservoirs and dams in India

References

Dams in Maharashtra
Dams completed in 2006
2006 establishments in Maharashtra